Alkè is an Italian truck, electric vehicles, and diesel engine manufacturer based in Padua, Italy. The company was created in 1992.

Electric vehicles 

Some of the electric cars made by Alkè (for example the Alkè ATX 100 E) are used in soccer stadiums as open ambulances. The operator of London's cycle hire scheme uses a small number of Alkè electric utility vehicles (alongside other cars and vans) to tow trailers for distributing bicycles.

Sustainable mobility 
Due to the constant attention that electric vehicles gather on the market, Alkè is getting involved in many green mobility projects, in the public administration like the project Cargohopper (a solar powered vehicle for urban center delivery in the city of Utrecht) or in the private sector for mobility inside no traffic zones

Motor Shows 
Alkè vehicles can frequently seen at the major Electric motor show around Europe, such as: Pollutec, Saltex, GaLaBau, Kommunalmesse, BlueTech, Electri Motor Show (Finland); with many appreciations even from the Royal Families.

Worldwide sales 

Alkè electric vehicles are sold worldwide, through more than 30 resellers in different countries.

In UK Alké vehicles are imported by ePowerTrucks.

References

External links 

Youtube Video for Cargohopper Utrecht logistic system explanation
Alkè Official Website

Truck manufacturers of Italy
Electric vehicle manufacturers of Italy
Emergency services equipment makers